Point Sal State Beach is a beach on the Pacific coast of California, located near the city of Guadalupe, in the northwestern part of Santa Barbara County. The rocks around the headland constitute part of the Coast Range Ophiolite, one of the largest ophiolite terranes in the world. This beach is at risk of landslides as there are rocky shorelines and extremely steep slopes. 

Among the most popular activities are fishing, beach combing, hiking, nature study, photography, picnicking and sunbathing. Swimming is not recommended due to dangerous rip currents, absence of lifeguard service, and occasional shark sightings. There are also no recreational facilities (toilets, picnic tables, etc.) Camping is prohibited due to security concerns involving Vandenberg Space Force Base. Camping can be subject to citation, arrest, and eviction by the Park Rangers and/or the 30th Security Forces Squadron.

History
In 1792, British explorer George Vancouver discovered Point Sal and decided to name it after Hermenegildo Sal, then the commandant of San Francisco. 

In the 1800s, Joel Clayton acquired  of land surrounding Point Sal. When Clayton's daughter married, he presented the land to the new couple as a wedding gift. The newly married couple arrived in the region in 1868 with the goal of developing the land surrounding the point.

In 1871, a wharf was built and, from 1872 to 1873, Point Sal was briefly the largest shipping destination that lay south of San Francisco. In 1877, the wharf was destroyed by rough seas and, due to development at other nearby ports, was never rebuilt.  

In 1940, the state of California acquired the land and converted the area into a state park. In 1941, Vandenberg Air Force Base was founded nearby and, as the base has grown, the United States Air Force has periodically restricted or imposed conditions on access to the beach.

Wildlife

Point Sal hosts a wide range of wildlife and fauna, including more than 300 native plant species and multiple types of seals, sea lions, and otters.

Access

During the winter of 1998, portions of the access road to the beach were washed out by winter rains. As of June 2011, the road has not been repaired and remains closed to vehicles. Point Sal State Beach is accessible only to visitors who hike to the beach. Visitors should allow sufficient time to return to the trailhead on Brown Road by sunset.

Alternatively, the strong hiker can trek  (round trip) to the state beach from Rancho Guadalupe Dunes County Park located to the north of Point Sal. The park closes at 7:30 pm, well before local sundown in the summer.

The route involving going through Casmalia using Point Sal Road is no longer accessible to the general public since it requires traversing Vandenberg Space Force Base.

See also
List of beaches in California
List of California state parks

References

Beaches of Southern California
California State Beaches
Parks in Santa Barbara County, California
Beaches of Santa Barbara County, California